USS Active may refer to the following ships of the United States Navy:

 , a brigantine-rigged packet launched in 1779 and captured by the British man-of-war HMS Proserpine on 23 March 1782.
 , a schooner purchased in 1837 and sold in 1838.
 , a harbor tug launched in 1888, sunk in 1926, then raised and sold in 1929.
 , a motorboat that came under Navy control in April 1917.
 , a harbor tug acquired by the Navy from the United States Shipping Board on 20 April 1925.

See also
 
 
 

United States Navy ship names